Shota Gennadyevich Bibilov (born 6 August 1990) is a Russian former professional footballer of Ossetian descent.

Club career
He made his professional debut in the Russian First Division in 2008 for FC Alania Vladikavkaz.

He played his first game for the main squad of FC Rubin Kazan on 24 September 2015 in a Russian Cup game against FC SKA-Energiya Khabarovsk which his team lost 0-2.

References

1990 births
People from Gardabani
Living people
Russian footballers
Russia youth international footballers
Russia under-21 international footballers
FC Spartak Vladikavkaz players
Russian Premier League players
FC Volga Nizhny Novgorod players
FC Rubin Kazan players
Russian people of Ossetian descent
Association football midfielders
FC Volgar Astrakhan players
FC Nizhny Novgorod (2015) players